3/8 or ⅜ may refer to:

 3rd Battalion, 8th Marines
 the calendar date March 8 (United States)
 the calendar date August 3 (Gregorian calendar)
 the fraction (mathematics), three eighths or 0.375 in decimal
 a time signature
 3/8 (album), a 2007 album by Kay Tse